The Modern Jazz Quartet and the Oscar Peterson Trio at the Opera House is a live album by American jazz group the Modern Jazz Quartet and the Oscar Peterson Trio featuring performances recorded in Chicago in 1957 and released as a split album on the Verve label. The tracks by Oscar Peterson were subsequently released on Peterson's 1957 album Oscar Peterson at the Concertgebouw.

Reception
The AllMusic reviewer Scott Yanow stated: "While the MJQ sounds much more introverted than the more exuberant Oscar Peterson Trio, the two popular groups have more similarities than differences".

Track listing
Side One:
 "D & E Blues" (John Lewis) - 4:08   
 "Now's the Time" (Charlie Parker) -  4:34   
 "'Round About Midnight" (Thelonious Monk) - 3:47  
Side Two: 
 "Should I?" (Nacio Herb Brown, Arthur Freed) - 4:28   
 "Big Fat Mama" (Lucky Millinder, Stafford Simon) - 7:24   
 "Indiana" (James F. Hanley, Ballard MacDonald) - 3:55   
 "Joy Spring" (Clifford Brown) - 5:27   
 "Elevation" (Elliot Lawrence, Gerry Mulligan) - 3:18

Personnel
Side One:
Milt Jackson - vibraphone
John Lewis - piano
Percy Heath - bass
Connie Kay - drums
Side Two
Oscar Peterson - piano
Herb Ellis - guitar
Ray Brown - bass

References

1957 albums
Verve Records live albums
Modern Jazz Quartet live albums
Oscar Peterson live albums
Albums produced by Norman Granz